Everything Picture was the debut album by the English indie rock band Ultrasound.  It was released on Nude Records, the label of Suede and Geneva, in April 1999 and reached #23 in the UK albums chart.  It was released over two compact discs due to its extraordinary length; the final song alone lasted over 39 minutes.

The album spawned three singles; "Same Band", "Stay Young" and "Floodlit World". A fourth single, "Aire & Calder", was announced but was not released.

In October 2011, NME placed "Stay Young" at number 109 on its list "150 Best Tracks of the Past 15 Years".

Track listing

CD1

CD2

References

1999 debut albums